The 1922 Miami Redskins football team was an American football team that represented Miami University as a member of the Ohio Athletic Conference (OAC) during the 1922 college football season. In its second and final season under head coach Harry W. Ewing, Miami compiled a 4–3–1 record (4–3 against conference opponents) and finished in 10th place out of 19 teams in the OAC.

Schedule

References

Miami
Miami RedHawks football seasons
Miami Redskins football